Heterops bicolor is a species of beetle in the family Cerambycidae. It was described by Fisher in 1936.

References

Heteropsini
Beetles described in 1936